Enrica Follieri (5 December 1926 – 11 December 1999) was an Italian philologist and paleographer, specialized in Byzantine literature and hagiography. She spent her whole academic career at La Sapienza University of Rome.

Biography 
Born in Rome in a family of Pugliese origins (her parents were from Foggia), she graduated in Classics from La Sapienza University in 1948, tutored by Byzantinist Silvio Giuseppe Mercati. She immediately became Assistant of Antonio Maria Cervi, then Professor of Classical Philology, and of Mercati, and then also of Ciro Giannelli who succeeded Mercati.

She obtained habilitation ("libera docenza") in Byzantine philology in 1960 and in Greek Paleography on the following year and was Professor of Greek Paleography at the Scuola Speciale per Archivisti e Bibliotecari (connected to La Sapienza) from 1961 to 1975. In 1976 she applied for the Chairs of Byzantine Philology and Greek Paleography at La Sapienza, winning both; she chose to hold the former, teaching the latter per assignment. At the Scuola Speciale, she was succeeded in 1979 by her pupil Lidia Perria, and at La Sapienza by Guglielmo Cavallo (since 1975 Professor of Latin Paleography, then—from 1978 on—Professor of Greek Paleography).

She retired on 31 October 1999 and died less than two months later in Rome.

Research 
Follieri devoted herself essentially to Byzantine religious literature, and particularly hagiography. She studied and critically edited homiletic, hagiographic, and religious Byzantine texts, both in prose and in verses. German Byzantinist Vera von Falkenhausen pointed out that more than half of Follieri's works deal with hagiographic matters, but if one considers all the specific passages about hagiography, the percentage raises up to 95%.

She also was a skilled paleographer and gave significant contributions to the study of the history of Greek handwriting, particularly focusing on Southern Italian manuscripts and Greek manuscripts in minuscule writing from the IX-X centuries. A very specific punctuation mark, found in several manuscripts of both oriental and Southern Italian origins, was named after her (“chiodo Follieri”, i.e. “Follieri nail”, due to its shape).

Works (selection) 

 
 
 
 
 
 
 
 
 
 pp. 131–61: 
 pp. 163–85: 
 pp. 187–204: 
 pp. 205–48: 
 pp. 249–72: 
 pp. 273–336:

References 

1926 births
1999 deaths